Tomás Jones (born 1903, date of death unknown) was an Argentine swimmer. He competed in the men's 4 × 200 metre freestyle relay event at the 1924 Summer Olympics.

References

External links
 

1903 births
Year of death missing
Olympic swimmers of Argentina
Swimmers at the 1924 Summer Olympics
Place of birth missing
Argentine male freestyle swimmers